Timblo-class patrol crafts are a series of patrol workboat built by Timblo Drydocks Private Limited, Goa.

Description
They are fitted with various navigation and communication equipment such as SART, EPIRB, GPS and VHF set etc.

Order cancellation
A contract was concluded on 15 October 2009 for construction of 30 workboats between the Ministry of Defence (MOD) and M/s Timblo Dry Docks Pvt Ltd, Goa for the Indian Coast Guard at a cost of ₨41.54 crores, which was subsequently amended to ₨41.43 crores. As per the contract, the first workboat was to be delivered by 15 April 2011 and the subsequent workboats were to be delivered every three months each with the last workboat contractually due for delivery on 15 July 2018. The shipyard failed to deliver a single vessel and there has been no progress since June 2012. The shipyard finally submitted its inability to progress ahead with the project due to incorrect inputs from their original designer resulting non fitting of equipment as per provision of contract during the meeting held at MOD on 12 March 2013.

See also
 AMPL Class
 Mandovi Marine (12.5-Meter) Class Patrol Craft
 Swallow Craft Class Inshore Patrol Vessel
 Timblo class interceptor craft

References

External links

Fast attack craft of the Indian Coast Guard
Patrol boat classes